1.9KS2150 is a solid propellant rocket engine designed by RPI and used in some stages of the Cajun Dart, Deacon and Loki rockets. It was used in at least 617 launches.

References 

Rocket engines